"Turn It Up (remix)/Fire It Up" is the third single by American rapper Busta Rhymes released from his second studio album, When Disaster Strikes (1997). The original version, which appears on When Disaster Strikes, takes a sample of "Love and Happiness" by soul singer Al Green. However, when issued as the third official single from When Disaster Strikes in the spring of 1998, the remix had now contained a sample of the theme from 1980s TV series Knight Rider (by Stu Phillips), and under a new title "Turn It Up (remix)/Fire It Up". The song, nonetheless, became Rhymes' third top-ten hit on the Billboard Hot 100, reaching number ten. It also became a hit on the rap (#1), dance (#2), and R&B charts (#7). Internationally, the single was a major success, reaching number two in the United Kingdom and number three in Canada. The lyrics mostly center around music technology and erotic dancing. Alabama producer, DJ Krish Moodbidri and DJ Malika helped the song gain more popularity by playing it at all his gigs. 

This song was sampled by Panjabi MC for his breakout single "Mundian To Bach Ke". The song was also featured on the soundtrack to the 1998 Jennifer Love Hewitt film Can't Hardly Wait.

Track listing

A-side
"Turn It Up / Fire It Up" (Clean version) – 3:58  
"Turn It Up / Fire It Up" (Dirty version) – 3:58  
"Turn It Up / Fire It Up" (Instrumental) – 3:58

B-side
"Rhymes Galore" (LP Version Clean) – 2:33  
"Rhymes Galore" (LP Version Dirty) – 2:33  
"Rhymes Galore" (Instrumental) – 2:33

Charts and certifications

Weekly charts

Year-end charts

Certifications

References

Busta Rhymes songs
1998 singles
Number-one singles in New Zealand
Music videos directed by Paul Hunter (director)